The following lists events that happened in 2011 in Iceland.

Incumbents
President – Ólafur Ragnar Grímsson 
Prime Minister – Jóhanna Sigurðardóttir

Politics
 Icelandic loan guarantees referendum, 2011

Deaths
 9 March – Valgerður Hafstað, 80, painter

References

 
2010s in Iceland
Iceland
Iceland
Years of the 21st century in Iceland